Urmas Lõoke (born 12 November 1950, in Tartu) is an Estonian architect.

Urmas Lõoke studied in the State Art Institute of the Estonian SSR (today's Estonian Academy of Arts) in the department of architecture. He graduated from the institute in 1975.

Urmas Lõoke works in the architectural bureau Lõokese Ummi Arhitektuuribüroo OÜ.

Notable works by Urmas Lõoke are the office building of the company Transgroup Invest and the main building of the Estonian Railway. Urmas Lõoke is the member of the Union of Estonian Architects.

Works
EMT technological center in Tallinn
Transgroup Invest office building
Main building of the Estonian Railway

References

Sources
Union of Estonian Architects
Architectural Bureau Urmas Lõokese Arhitektuuribüroo OÜ, works

Estonian architects
1950 births
Living people
People from Tartu
Estonian Academy of Arts alumni